Montpelier Carnegie Library, also known as the Public Library of Montpelier and Harrison Township, is a historic Carnegie library located at Montpelier, Blackford County, Indiana.  It was built in 1908, and is a one-story, rectangular, brick and limestone building.  A brick addition was erected in 1992.  Its construction was funded with $10,000 from Andrew Carnegie.

It was listed on the National Register of Historic Places in 2007.

The public library is still in operation under the name Montpelier Harrison Township Public Library.

References

External links 

Montpelier Harrison Township Public Library website

Carnegie libraries in Indiana
Libraries on the National Register of Historic Places in Indiana
Library buildings completed in 1908
Buildings and structures in Blackford County, Indiana
National Register of Historic Places in Blackford County, Indiana
1908 establishments in Indiana
Library buildings completed in 1992